Ilamatlán is a municipality in Veracruz, Mexico. It is located in central zone of the State of Veracruz, about 210 km from state capital Xalapa. It has a surface of 188.63 km2.

The municipality of Ilamatlán is delimited to the east by Zontecomatlán, to the south by Huayacocotla, to the north and west by Hidalgo State.

It produces principally maize, coffee, beans, sugarcane and chili pepper.

In Ilamatlán, the celebration in honor of Santiago Apostol, patron saint of the town, takes place in July.

The weather in Ilamatlán is cold all year with rains in summer and autumn.

References

External links 

  Municipal Official webpage

Municipalities of Veracruz